The 2015 Northwestern State Demons football team represented Northwestern State University as a member of the Southland Conference during the 2015 NCAA Division I FCS football season. Led by third-year head coach Jay Thomas, the Demons compiled an overall record of 4–7 with a mark of 4–5 in conference play, placing in a three-way tie for fifth in the Southland. Northwestern State played home games at Harry Turpin Stadium in Natchitoches, Louisiana.

Schedule

Game summaries

Southeastern Louisiana

Sources:

@ Louisiana–Lafayette

Sources:

@ Mississippi State

 Source: Northwestern State vs Mississippi State

Central Arkansas

Sources:

@ Incarnate Word

Sources:

Lamar

Sources:

@ McNeese State

Sources:

@ Nicholls

Sources:

Abilene Christian

Sources:

@ Sam Houston State

Sources:

Stephen F. Austin

Sources:

References

Northwestern State
Northwestern State Demons football seasons
Northwestern State Demons football